Daniel le Tablere (1710 - 1775) was an Anglican priest in Ireland during the late decade of the 18th century and the first four of the 19th.

He was born in Dublin and educated at Trinity College, Dublin. He was appointed Prebendary of  Kildare Cathedral in 1749; Prebendary of St Patrick's Cathedral, Dublin in 1759 and Dean of Tuam in 1759, holding all three positions until his death.

References

Alumni of Trinity College Dublin
Deans of Tuam
18th-century Irish Anglican priests
1775 deaths
1710 births
Christian clergy from Dublin (city)